Paethongtarn Shinawatra (nicknamed Ung Ing, born 21 August 1986), is a Thai politician and businesswoman. She is the youngest daughter of the former Thai prime minister Thaksin Shinawatra. She is serving as the Pheu Thai Party's chairwoman of the Advisory Committee on Participation and Innovation.

Personal life 
Paethongtarn Shinawatra was born in Bangkok. She went to Saint Joseph Convent School for junior high school and Mater Dei School for high school. She graduated with a bachelor's degree in Political Science, Sociology and Anthropology from the Faculty of Political Science, Chulalongkorn University in 2008 and continued her studies in England, earning a MSC degree in International Hotel Management from the University of Surrey.

Paethongtarn is the No. 1 shareholder of SC Asset Corporation and a director of the Thaicom Foundation. She is married to Pitaka Suksawat and they have one daughter.

Political career 
At a meeting of the Pheu Thai Party on March 20, 2022, Paethongtarn was elected as "Head of the Pheu Thai Family". When speaking at the Pheu Thai Party's annual general meeting in April 2022, she said that she wants to see regime change in Thailand and wants to gain more experience before standing for the post of the country’s prime minister.

Royal decorations 
 2005 – The Most Admirable Order of the Direkgunabhorn, 6th Class, Gold Medal (G.M.T.)

References 

1986 births
Living people
Paethongtarn Shinawatra
Paethongtarn Shinawatra
Paethongtarn Shinawatra
Paethongtarn Shinawatra
People from Bangkok
Alumni of the University of Surrey